Eradu Mukha is a 1969 Indian Kannada-language film, directed by M. R. Vittal and produced by B. V. Srinivas, K. S. Prasad and A. S. Bhakthavathsalam. The film stars Jayanthi, Rajesh, K. S. Ashwath and Sampath in the lead roles. The film has musical score by Vijaya Bhaskar. The film was adapted from the novel of the same name written by Aryamba Pattabhi. The movie won the Karnataka State Film Awards - Third Best Film for the year 1969–70.

Cast

Jayanthi
Rajesh
K. S. Ashwath
Sampath
Narasimharaju
Ranga
Subbanna
Srinivas
B. Jaya
Vijayaleela
Indrani
Yamunadevi
S. Indrani
Manjula (credited as Kumari Manjula)
Baby Mala
Srividya
Lakshmi Janardhan

References

External links
 

1969 films
1960s Kannada-language films
Films based on Indian novels
Films about mental health